Shaykh Muhammad Nazim Adil Al-Qubrusi Al-Haqqani (born Mehmet Nâzım Âdil; 21 April 1922 – 7 May 2014), commonly known as Shaykh Nazim, was a Turkish Cypriot Sunni Muslim imam and one of the most influential members of the Sublime Naqshbandí Order (tariqa) of Sunni Islam

Names
Shaykh Nazim was active both in Turkish and Arabic language contexts. His name was therefore transliterated into English in various ways: Nazim al-Qubrusi ), indicating his homeland of Cyprus, and Muhammad Nazım 'Adil al-Qubrusi al-Haqqani an-Naqshbandi. His name al-Haqqani is an honorific name granted by his Sufi teacher Shaykh Abdullah Fa'izi ad-Daghestani. He has no connection with the Islamic insurgent group known as the Haqqani network.

Early life

Shaykh Nazim was born Mehmet Nâzım Âdil on April 21, 1922, and traced his lineage back to Imam Abdul Qadir Gilani through his paternal Grandfather Shaykh Yesilbas Hussayn al-Qadiri and Mawláná Rumi through his maternal grandfather Shaykh Kaytazzâde Mehmet Nâzım who he was named after.

During his studies he moved to Istanbul, Turkey, in 1940 to study chemical engineering at Istanbul University. He would later state: "I felt no attraction to modern science; my heart was always drawn to the spiritual sciences."

Studies in Sharia' and Sufism
Nazim studied Classical Arabic and Islamic Jurisprudence (fiqh) in Istanbul, Turkey under Jamal al-Din al-Alsuni (d. 1955 CE/1375 AH) and received an ijaza (permission to teach) in these subjects from him. He was initiated in Naqshbandi Sufism by Sulayman Arzarumi (d. 1948 CE/1368 AH), who eventually directed him to Damascus, Syria, to continue his studies with his destined sheikh. He left Istanbul and arrived in Syria in 1944.

Nazim continued his studies in Aleppo, Hama, and Homs in Syria. In Homs, he studied at the madrasa adjoining the burial shrine and mosque of Muhammad's companion, Khalid ibn al-Walid. There, he received further ijazas in Hanafi jurisprudence (fiqh) from Muhammad 'Ali' Ayoun al-Soud and Abdul Jalil Murad.

Following the end of the unrest in the region due to World War II, Nazim was able to enter Damascus in 1945. There, he met Abdullah Fa'izi ad-Daghestani, and they exchanged the Sufi oath of mutual allegiance (bay'ah). He trained him well in Naqshbandi Sufi path. Nazim would consider Abdullah as his primary spiritual director (murshid) until the latter's death in 1973.

Islamic missionary activity

Nazim returned to Cyprus and began Islamic missionary activity. Whilst there, he came into conflict with the Kemalist governing body of the Turkish community of the island, which in accordance with Kemalist ideology was actively striving to de-Islamize the society. The government had enacted laws forbidding the public performance of the Islamic call to prayer (adhan) in its traditional Arabic form. Regardless, Nazim continued to do so. The conflict was resolved with the coming to power of Adnan Menderes in Turkey, whose government chose a more tolerant approach to Islamic traditions.

Nazim took up residence in Damascus in 1952 to continue his studies with Abdullah, though he continued to spend three months or more each year in his native Cyprus.

Following the death of Abdullah Fa'izi ad-Daghestani in 1973, Nazim was made his spiritual successor. In 1974, he began to visit Western Europe, traveling every year to London, England, for the month of Ramadan. He gained a large following of spiritual seekers from Western Europe and North America, many of whom converted to Islam after encountering his teaching. From 1980, his lectures on Islam and Sufism were published in English and other European languages.

Nazim's transnational appeal was facilitated by his ability to speak English, Turkish, Arabic, and Greek.

In his later years, Nazim was regularly recognized among the world's fifty most influential Muslims in the annual publication, The 500 Most Influential Muslims: he was ranked 42nd in the 2013/2014 edition.

Notable students and followers of Al-Haqqani include John G. Bennett, the British author on spirituality, and Rank Nazeer Ahmed, the Indian Muslim scholar and legislator.

Political opinions

Nazim was involved in politics. He had close ties with several notable politicians, notably the late president of Turkey, Turgut Özal, and the Turkish Cypriot leader, Rauf Denktaş. Born just before the fall of the Ottoman Empire, he praised Ottoman history and civilization, contrasting its culture with its successor, the modern-day Republic of Turkey.

Shaykh Nazim can be seen addressing multitudes of Turkish people in a stadium whose audience includes the likes of Abdullah Gül, Recep Tayyip Erdoğan, and Necmettin Erbakan. In it he discusses the importance of Islamic values of the Turkish state, discussing how their forefathers were the Ottomans who ruled the country as a caliphate for more than 600 years until its downfall.

Death

Nazim had been receiving medical care since April 17, 2014, when he was rushed from his home in Lefke to the Near East University Hospital in North Nicosia, Northern Cyprus, after suffering from respiratory problems. He died on May 7, 2014 (8 Rajab 1435), aged 92.

Shaykh Nazim was succeeded by his eldest son, Shaykh Mehmet 'Adil ar-Rabbani, as the 41st leader of the Naqshbandi Tariqa.

Published works 
 al-Qubrusi, Nazim. 1980. Mercy Oceans: The teachings of Maulana Abdullah al-Faizi ad-Daghestani. n.p.
 Daghistānī, ʻAbd Allāh al-Naqshbandī, and Nazim Haqqani. 1980. Mercy oceans: Winter lectures 1400 H. (1980 A. D.); Book two. Konya, Turkey: Sebat.
 al-Qubrusi, Nazim 'Adil. 1982. Mercy Oceans' Endless Horizons; Summer lectures from 1981. Konya, Turkei: Sebat Offset Pr.
 al-Qubrusi, Nazim 'Adil. 1983. Mercy Oceans' Pink Pearls. Konya, Turkei: Sebat Offset Pr.
 Haqqani, Nazim. 1984. Mercy oceans' divine sources: The discourses of our master Shaykh Nazim Al-Qubrusi (Imam ul-Haqqaniyyin). Konya, Turkey: Sebat.
 –––. 1985. Mercy oceans of the heart: the discourses of our master Shaykh Nazim Al-Qubrusi (Imam ul-Haqqaniyyin). [Turkey?]: [s.n.].
 al-Qubrusi, Nazim 'Adil. 1986. Mercy Oceans Rising Sun. Konya, Turkey: Sebat.
 Haqqani, Nazim. 1987. The secrets behind the secrets behind the secrets. Berlin: Duru.
 al-Qubrusi, Nazim 'Adil. Toward the Divine Presence: Book one, London Talks, Summer 1984. n.p.n.d.
 Haqqani, Nazim. 1987. Mercy oceans' lovestream: the discourses of our master Shaykh Nazim al-Qubrusi al-Haqqani delivered by the permission of his Grandsheikh Shaykh Abdullah Ad-Daghistani; Selected lectures Summer 1406 A. H. (1986 C. E.); London, Germany, Switzerland. Konya: Sebat.
 Haqqani, Nazim. 1987. Mercy oceans: Serendib edition; Transcript of lectures. Colombo: Council of Thareeqathun Naqshbandhia.
 Al-Qubrusi, Shaykh Nazim 'Adil. 1988. Mercy Oceans' Hidden Treasures, 2nd ed. Konya, Turkey: Sebat.
 Daghistānī, ʻAbd Allāh al-Naqshbandī, Nazim Haqqani. 1988. The Naqshbandi way: a guidebook for spiritual progress; The spiritual exercises of the Naqshbandi Sufi path according to the instructions of Sultan Ul-Awliya Shaykh Abdullah Ad-Daghistani. Konya, Turkey: Mercy Oceans publications.
 An-Naqshabandi, Shaykh Nazim 'Adil Al-Haqqani. 1989. Mercy Oceans Saphires from Serendib. Colombo, Sri Lanka: Arafat Publishing House.
 Naqshbandi, Muhammad Nazim 'Adil al-Haqqani. 1990. From Dunya to Maule: (from here to hereafter). İstanbul: Sebil Yayınevi.
 An-Naqshabandi, Shaykh Nazim 'Adil Al-Haqqani. 1990. Mercy Oceans' Emeralds of Eden: Lectures of a Sufi Grandsheikh. Colombo, Sri Lanka: Peacock Printers.
 –––. 1992. Natural medicines. London: Ta-Ha.
 Naqshbandi, Muhammad Nazim 'Adil al-Haqqani. 1994. Mystical secrets of the last days. Los Altos, CA: Haqqani Islamic Trust for New Muslims.
 Haqqani Naqshbandia, Shaykh Nazim al al-. 1994. Keys to paradise. London: Zero Productions.
 Naqshbandi, Muhammad Nazim 'Adil al-Haqqani. 1994. The divine kingdom. Los Altos, CA: Haqqani Islamic Trust for New Muslims.
 Haqqani, Sheik Nazim. 1995. Natural medicines: traditional Sufi healing methods. London: Zero Productions.
 al-Haqqani, Nazim. 1995. Power oceans of light. London: Zero Publications.
 Naqshbandi, Muhammad Nazim 'Adil al-Haqqani. 1995. When will peace come to earth?: Oh people, don't waste. London: Zero Productions.
 Haqqani, Nazim. 1996. Secret desires: talks given in 1996 in Germany and Great Britain by a sufi master of our time. London: Zero Productions.
 Naqshbandi, Muhammad Nazim 'Adil al-Haqqani. 1997. Defending truth: associations with a Sufi master of our time. London: Zero Productions.
 Nāẓim ʻAdl al-Ḥaqqānī, Muḥammad. 1997. Islam the freedom to serve: Suhbats, aphorisms, and stories. Bonndorf im Schwarzwald: Gorski und Spohr.
 al-Haqqani, Shaykh Nazim. 1998. Pure hearts. London: Zero Productions.
 Naqshbandi, Muhammad Nazim 'Adil al-Haqqani. 1998. Secret desires. London: Healing Hearts / Zero Productions.
 –––. 1998. Star from heaven: talks given in 1995 by a Sufi master of our time in England, Germany, Switzerland and Italy. London: Zero Productions.
 Sheikh Muhammad Nazim Al Haqqani, and Khairiyah Siegel, 1999, "On the Bridge to Eternity", the millennium book
 –––. 2002. In the mystic footsteps of saints. 2 vols. Fenton Mich: Naqshbandi Haqqani Sufi Order.
 Al-Haqqani, Shaykh Nazim 'Adil. 2002–2007. Liberating the soul: a guide for spiritual growth. 6 vols. [S.l.]: Islamic Supreme Council of America.
 Naqshbandi, Muhammad Nazim 'Adil al-Haqqani, and Muhammad Hisham Kabbani. 2004. Naqshbandi awrad of Mawláná Shaykh Muhammad Nazim 'Adil al-Haqqani. Fenton, MI: Islamic Supreme Council of America.
 Naqshbandi, Muhammad Nazim 'Adil al-Haqqani. 2006. The path to spiritual excellence. Fenton, MI: Islamic Supreme Council of America.
 Naqshbandi, Muhammad Nazim 'Adil al-Haqqani. 2007. Through the eye of the needle: Counsel for Spiritual Survival in the Last Days. Fenton, Mich: Institute for Spiritual & Cultural Advancement.
 Al-Haqqani, Mawláná Shaykh Nazim, and Hamidah Torres. 2008. Sufi spiritual practices for polishing the mirror in the heart. [Mar de Plata, Argentina]: SereSereS.
 Al-Haqqani, Mawláná Shaykh Nazim. 2008. Love sufi teachings and spiritual practices. Málaga: SereSereS.
 Naqshbandi, Muhammad Nazim 'Adil al-Haqqani. 2010. The Sufilive series. Fenton, MI: Institute for Spiritual and Cultural Advancement (ISCA).
 Naqshbandi, Muhammad Nazim 'Adil al-Haqqani, and Muhammad Hisham Kabbani. 2010. Spiritual discourses of Sultan al-Awliya Mawláná Shaykh Muhammad Nazim 'Adil Al-Haqqani. Fenton, MI: Institute for Spiritual and Cultural Advancement (ISCA).
 –––. 2010. Breaths from beyond the curtain: spiritual guidance of the Naqshbandi Sufi Masters. Fenton, Mich: Institute for Spiritual and Cultural Advancement.
Shaykh Nazim, over 2,000 pieces of unique video content: Sheikh Nazım Al Haqqani Al Qubrusi An Naqshibandi

References

https://en.m.wikipedia.org/wiki/Hazrat_Ishaan
https://en.m.wikipedia.org/wiki/Serene_Highness

Further reading
Ron Geaves, The Sufis of Britain: An Exploration of Muslim Identity (Cardiff: Cardiff Academic Press, 2000), pp. 145 – 156 
Ludwig Schleßmann, Sufismus in Deutschland: Deutsche auf dem Weg des mystischen Islam (Cologne: Bo¨hlau, 2003), pp. 43 –136
Jørgen S. Nielsen, "Transnational Islam and the Integration of Islam in Europe" in Stefano Allievi and Jørgen S Nielsen (eds), Muslim Networks and Transnational Communities in and across Europe (Leiden: Brill, 2003) 28 –51.
David Damrel, "Aspects of the Naqshbandi-Haqqani Order in America" in Jamal Malik and John R. Hinnells (eds.), Sufism in the West (Abingdon: Routledge, 2006). 
Jørgen S. Nielsen, Mustafa Draper and Galina Yemelianova, "Transnational Sufism: The Haqqaniyya" in Jamal Malik and John R. Hinnells (eds), Sufism in the West (Abingdon: Routledge, 2006), pp. 103– 114. 
Simon Stjernholm, "A Translocal Sufi Movement: Developments among Naqshbandi-Haqqani in London" in Catharina Raudvere and Leif Stenberg (eds), Sufism Today: Heritage and Tradition in the Global Community (London: I.B. Tauris, 2009), pp. 83 – 101. 
Simon Stjernholm, Lovers of Muhammad: A Study of Naqshbandi-Haqqani Sufis in the Twenty-First Century (Lund: Lund University, 2011).

1922 births
2014 deaths
Sufi saints
Naqshbandi order
Hasanids
20th-century apocalypticists
Grand Muftis
Istanbul University alumni
People from Larnaca
Turkish Cypriot Sunni Muslims
Cypriot Muslims
Turkish Sufis
Turkish Cypriot Sufi saints
Turkish Cypriot Sufi religious leaders
Turkish monarchists